Pseudaphelia apollinaris is a species of moth in the family Saturniidae first described by Jean Baptiste Boisduval in 1847.

References

Saturniinae